{{DISPLAYTITLE:C11H6O4}}
The molecular formula C11H6O4 (molar mass: 202.16 g/mol, exact mass: 202.0266 u) may refer to:

 Bergaptol, a furanocoumarin
 Xanthotoxol, a furanocoumarin